Jelly shoes or jellies are a type of shoe made of PVC plastic. Jelly shoes come in a large variety of brands and colours and the material is sometimes infused with glitter. Its name comes from the French company called Jelly Shoes, founded by Tony Alano and Nicolas Guillon in 1980 in Paris. 

Although pvc-injected shoes were created after WWII, they were cheap and unappreciated. The shoes became a fashion trend in the early 1980s after the shoes of the company Jelly Shoes appeared in major French and European magazines, Paris fashion shows, and shoe fairs.  Like many other fashion trends from the 1980s, jellies have been revived a number of times since the late 1990s.

History

Post-war plastic shoes 
After world war II, man-made materials such as plastics were cheap alternatives to natural textiles, such as leather and cotton. The French company Sarraizienne claims to have created the first shoe in PVC in the 50's and they were used by fishermen for its ease of cleaning and low prices.  The shoes were sold in large baskets and were transparent and depreciated in terms of fashion.

The creation of Jelly Shoes 
In 1980, Brazilian Tony Alano and French Nicolas Guillon were living in Paris in their 20's. Whilst on Holidays in Spain, they had an idea to transform the cheap, ugly, transparent and depreciated shrimp fishermen's shoe into a fun, colorful, urban and fashionable shoe. With a loan from Nicolas's mother, they purchase two hundred Sarrazienne's 'fisherman's' shoes and with the help of Tony's brother, a chemist, they create a special dye. Tony and Nicolas then dyed the shoes in their kitchen, dried them in their bathroom, and packaged the product in their living room. Because they were handmade, the shoes had a diverse color palette with many colors not yet seen in modern footwear. They then sold  the shoes at a Parisian boutique for prices between 60 to 140 Francs, around 5-10 times more than they were found in the supermarkets. There is also an account that the friendship Tony had with artist Salvador Dali in Paris inspired the creation of Jelly Shoes.

Early days, the frenzy, and today 

Jelly Shoes early summer models were bright, colorful and sometimes glitter-infused fishermen's shoes. They came in 12 different colors and had a vanilla or lemon perfume. The winter models, or "Robin Hood" boots, were walking shoes with laces and jacquard lining, and escarpins decorated with a bow tie. 

The shoes were original and audacious and since the shoes were distributed in glamorous boutiques in Paris, many magazines, shoemakers, and other boutiques started to take notice.  

In 1981, the company Jelly Shoes and their supplier, Sarrazienne, the French fisherman's shoe manufacturer, had a dispute as Sarrazienne allegedly broke their exclusivity contract and sold Jelly Shoes's models to other clients. 

Jelly Shoes then closed a contract with the Brazilian plastic shoe manufacturer and exporter Grendene in 1982 (a global plastic shoe company that would become the biggest plastic shoe manufacturer in the world). In many ways, it was the perfect partnership, as the combination of the experimental, artistic and trendy company Jelly Shoes with the manufacturing power that was Grendene proved to be highly successful.

A year later the shoes exploded onto the scene in media and in stores. The Jelly Shoes company grew 20 times the number of shoes they sold in 1 year. Major French fashion magazines were displaying Jelly Shoes in collections and covering them in articles.  Major stylists such as Thierry Mugler and Jean-Paul Gaultier were designing Jelly Shoes. The plastic shoe had become an item of fashion.
Boutiques and stores around the world, influenced by the French, who had in Paris the center of fashion, started ordering an ever growing number of shoes.

In 1983 in the United States Doris Johanson of the New York department store Bloomingdale’s, ordered 2400 pairs of a model of Jelly Shoes she had spotted in Europe. Grendene was quick to serve that order with the brand Grendha in the USA. 

Multiple newspapers and magazines started to cover the story. The shoes became a global trend. Meanwhile, the Brazilian manufacturer Grendene was exporting to over 48 countries with their own brand Melissa and Grendha.
Even though the shoes were known under many different names throughout the world, the original French company Jelly Shoes gradually became the term for the "jelly" style of shoe.

As the trend grew globally, so did the amount of brands. Jelly Shoes tried to protect their shoe models and brand but the company didn’t have the resources to move multiple legal cases in many different countries. One of their models, for example, the tcha-tcha, an italian company started calling their own model Tcha-tch creating a legal dispute. 
The Jelly Shoe company stopped operating in February 1986 but the type of shoe has been reinterpreted by a number of high-end fashion designers in the early twenty-first century. Crocs, for example, are seen by many as a modern take on Jelly sandals.

Controversy 
There have been claims about the potential health hazards of PVC for humans and its negative impact on the environment. The industry responded by developing non-toxic and ecological solutions.

See also
 Crocs
 Flip-flops
 List of shoe styles
 Sandals

References

1980s fashion
1990s fashion
2000s fashion
Sandals
Shoes